The Germansen River, formerly Germansen Creek, is a major south tributary of the Omenica River in the Northern Interior of British Columbia, Canada. The settlement and former gold-rush centre of Germansens Landing is located at its confluence with the Omineca.

Name origin
All "Germansen" placenames were named for James Germansen, of St. Paul, Minnesota, who first discovered gold deposits here in 1870, during the Omineca Gold Rush.

Gold placer earnings
The first reported earnings from the benches along Germansen Creek were a little over a year after James Germansen's first strike, with $10,000 reported in the last week of August, 1871.  By the end of that season in October, a total of $400,000 by Peter O'Reilly, who was then Gold Commissioner for the Cariboo Mining Division. Earnings waned from that point, with $80,000 being reported for Germansen and Manson Creeks for the season in 1874 and $32,000 being reported for 1875.  By 1876, the mining district was "almost deserted".

References

Rivers of the Omineca Mountains
Omineca Country
Mines in British Columbia